Andinosaura crypta is a species of lizard in the family Gymnophthalmidae. It is endemic to Ecuador.

References

Andinosaura
Reptiles of Ecuador
Endemic fauna of Ecuador
Reptiles described in 2011
Taxa named by Santiago J. Sánchez-Pacheco
Taxa named by David A. Kizirian
Taxa named by Pedro M. Sales-Nunes
Taxobox binomials not recognized by IUCN